John Westbrook Hornbeck (January 24, 1804 – January 16, 1848) was a Whig member of the U.S. House of Representatives from Pennsylvania.

Biography
Westbrook Hornbeck was born in Montague Township, New Jersey.  He graduated from Union College in Schenectady, New York, in 1827.  He studied law, was admitted to the bar of Northampton County, Pennsylvania, in 1829 and commenced practice in Allentown, Pennsylvania, in 1830.  He was commissioned deputy attorney general of the State of Pennsylvania for Lehigh County, Pennsylvania, in 1836 and served three years.

Hornbeck was elected as a Whig to the Thirtieth Congress and served until his death in Allentown in 1848.  He served as chairman of the United States House Committee on Revisal and Unfinished Business during the Thirtieth Congress.  Interment in Allentown Cemetery.

See also
List of United States Congress members who died in office (1790–1899)

Sources

The Political Graveyard

1804 births
1848 deaths
Pennsylvania lawyers
Politicians from Allentown, Pennsylvania
People from Montague Township, New Jersey
Whig Party members of the United States House of Representatives from Pennsylvania
19th-century American politicians
19th-century American lawyers